Lovepump United is an independent record label founded in 2004 by Vassar College students Jake Friedman and Mookie Singerman in Poughkeepsie, New York. The label is based in New York City. Friedman and Singerman were the only members of a duo Glitter Pals whose EP was Lovepump's first release; the band has disbanded. Singerman is also the vocalist for Philadelphia-based "cybergrind" band Genghis Tron whose Cloak of Love EP was the second Lovepump release. Lovepump first gained attention in indie music circles by releasing the debut album by the much buzzed about Montreal based noise rock band AIDS Wolf in January 2006.

Discography
 LPU 001 - Glitter Pals, Unleash The Compassion CD EP (January 10, 2005)
 LPU 002 - Genghis Tron, Cloak of Love 10" picture EP (March 29, 2005)
 LPU 003 - Pre / AIDS Wolf / Demonstrations / Crack Und Ultra Eczema, 2 x 7" Split  (November 2005)
 LPU 004 - Doesn't exist
 LPU 005 - AIDS Wolf, The Lovvers LP / CD (January 24, 2006)
 LPU 006 - Genghis Tron, Dead Mountain Mouth LP (June 27, 2006)
 LPU 007 - Child Abuse / Miracle Of Birth, CD Split (September 12, 2006)
 LPU 008 - Indian Jewelry, Invasive Exotics LP (September 12, 2006)
 LPU 009 - Dynasty Handbag, Foo Foo Yik Yik CD (October 24, 2006)
 LPU 010 - USAISAMONSTER, picture 7" (April 10, 2007)
 LPU 011 - Child Abuse, Child Abuse CD (June 26, 2007)
 LPU 012 - Pre, Epic Fits LP (September 4, 2007)
 LPU 013 - Crystal Castles / Health, 7" Split (September 18, 2007)
 LPU 014 - Health, Health CD (September 18, 2007)
 LPU 015 - Clipd Beaks, Hoarse Lords CD (November 6, 2007)
 LPU 016 - Genghis Tron, Board Up The House LP (March 25, 2008)
 LPU 017 - Doesn't exist
 LPU 018 - AIDS Wolf, Cities of Glass LP (September 9, 2008)
 LPU 019 - Health, Health//Disco CD (May 27, 2008)
 LPU 020 - Genghis Tron, Board Up The House Remixes Volume 2 LP (October 14, 2008)
 LPU 021 - Indian Jewelry, "Free Gold!" LP (October 14, 2008)
 LPU 022 - Pictureplane, "Trance Doll" 7" (March 10, 2009)
 LPU 023 - Clipd Beaks, "Visions" 7" (March 10, 2009)
 LPU 024 - Health, "Die Slow" 7" (April 7, 2009)
 LPU 026 - Clipd Beaks, "To Realize" CD/2xLP (January 26, 2010)
 LPU 027 - Deradoorian, "Mind Raft" EP (May 5, 2009)
 LPU 028 - Health, Get Color (September 8, 2009)
 LPU 029 - Pictureplane, "Dark Rift" CD/LP (August 4, 2009)
 LPU 030 - Child Abuse, "Cut And Run" CD/LP (April 13, 2010)
 LPU 032 - Health, Health::Disco2 CD/2xLP (June 22, 2010)
 LPU 033 - Small Black/Washed Out, 7" (January 26, 2010)
 LPU 034 - AIDS Wolf, "Very Friendly" 12" (September 14, 2010)
 LPU 035 - Deradoorian, "Albert McCloud" - 7" (February 22, 2011) 
 LPU 037 - Pictureplane,  "Thee Physical" CD/LP (July 19, 2011)

See also 
 List of record labels

References
 Insound.com Interview
 Student's showcase featured at CMJ
 Interview for Detour Magazine

External links
 Official site

American independent record labels
Record labels established in 2004